A crisis plan is the physical manifestation of crisis management with respect to the creation of a real document – digital or otherwise – outlining a personal or organizational reaction to crisis.

Examples of a crisis plan could include a map of evacuation routes, an outline of a personal wellness recovery action, a list of emergency supplies, a CPR manual or a corporate disaster contingency plan.

A crisis plan could be stored or generated in digital form and be represented through the deployment of such as a smart phone app, USB key, PDF file format, or various other translations of a literal document.

Every crisis is different and individual plans vary by necessity.

Crisis plan implementation for emergency situations is assisted by modern technology.  There are numerous apps available for smart phones and other mobile technology platforms that promote enhanced crisis plan implementation and situational awareness.  One example is the "CPR & Choking" app for iPhone and iPad, developed in part by the University of Washington and King County EMS.

Personal crisis plan 

One element of personal wellness and mental health includes the creation of a crisis plan.  Development of a real crisis plan and post-crisis plan is key to the daily maintenance of the evidence-based practice of the Wellness Recovery Action Plan as referenced by the SAMHSA National Registry for Evidence-Based Programs and Practices.

Recovery from personal crisis or health crisis may be impeded by trauma, circumstance, or anxiety.  An effective post-crisis plan can reduce exposure to personal risk, including the impact of substance abuse and addictions.

With respect to mental health recovery – families, service providers and others can help develop crisis plans that form an effective and enforceable legal document that can be used in times when a person is unwell.

Mental health 'crisis cards' 

Those involved with mental health care have developed so-called 'crisis cards' which may be used in the event of a mental health crisis.  These cards may be used to present to friends, health care workers, police or strangers should an emergency ever arise and an individual becomes unwell.

Organizational crisis plan 

One example of a component of an organizational crisis plan is the Material Safety Data Sheet, which provides guidance and standards for the handling of hazardous and unsafe materials.  These documents are a key element of occupational safety and health.

Disclosing crisis online 

There are many complicated elements concerning privacy when discussing the disclosure of personal information online.  This is only made more so during times a person is pushed into crisis.  Given the nature and confusion of those in a crisis state, developing and maintaining a crisis plan that includes provisions dealing with online privacy is crucial.

See also 

 Emergency
 Disaster
 Health crisis

References 

Crisis
Emergency management